Edith Kertész-Gabry (18 July 1927 – 10 February 2012) was a Hungarian soprano and professor of opera at the Cologne University of Music.

Early years and education 

Edith Kertész-Gabry, born Edith Gáncz in Budapest, Hungary, studied at the Franz Liszt Academy of Music, and made her debut in 1951 at the Budapest National Opera. That same year, she married the conductor, István Kertész. After the Hungarian Revolution of 1956, Kertész-Gabry left Hungary and moved to Germany with her husband and young son.

Career 

Kertész-Gabry received an appointment to the Bremen Opera from where she moved on to Cologne in 1960. On 15 February 1965 she distinguished herself as a dramatic coloratura soprano in the lead role of Marie in the premiere of Bernd Alois Zimmermann's opera, Die Soldaten. Zimmermann's four-act opera commissioned by the Cologne Opera is considered one of the most important and influential operas written in Germany since the second world war."

Kertész-Gabry gave guest performances at various opera houses and festivals throughout Germany and abroad. During the earliest years of her singing career, she quickly expanded her repertoire to include Konstanze in the Die Entführung aus dem Serail, Susanna in The Marriage of Figaro, Fiordiligi in Così fan tutte, Pamina in The Magic Flute, Zerlina in Don Giovanni, Mrs. Fluth in Otto Nicolai's The Merry Wives of Windsor, the Baroness in Albert Lortzing's Der Wildschütz, Sophie in Der Rosenkavalier, Eva in Wagner's Die Meistersinger von Nürnberg, Desdemona in Verdi's Otello, Alice Ford in Verdi's Falstaff, Antonia in Jacques Offenbach's The Tales of Hoffmann, and Zerline in Daniel Auber's Fra Diavolo. At the 1967 Salzburg Festival she performed, Silvia in Mozart's, Ascanio in Alba. By then, her repertoire of operas from the 20th century also included, in addition to Marie in Die Soldaten, Cardillac's daughter in Paul Hindemith's Cardillac, and Luise in Hans Werner Henze's Der junge Lord.

Since 1971, in addition to performing regularly with the Cologne Opera, Kertész-Gabry taught at the Folkwang-Musikschule. Before 1977 she received a teaching appointment at the Cologne University of Music. In 1988, she performed one of her last notable performances at the Schwetzingen Festival. There she sang the role of Berta in Rossini's The Barber of Seville.

Death 

After a prolonged illness, Kertész-Gabry died in Cologne on February 10, 2012. She is survived by two children and five grandchildren.

Discography 

Brogli-Sacher, Roman, Friedhelm Dohl Edition, Vol. 8, Dreyer Gaido, 2010.
Handel, George Frideric, La resurrezione, Santini Chamber Orchestra of Münster, Conductor: Rudolf Ewerhart, 1961; reissue, 2005.
Mozart, Wolfgang Amadeus, Mitridate, re di Ponto, Mozarteum Orchestra of Salzburg, Conductor: Leopold Hager, 1970.
Rossini, Gioachino, The Barber of Seville, Stuttgart Radio Symphony Orchestra, Conductor: Gabriele Ferro, BMG Ariola 1993.
Verdi, Giuseppe, Otello, Augsburg State Opera, OPERA EPK 1220, 1962.
Zimmermann, Bernd Alois, Die Soldaten, Gürzenich Orchestra, Conductor: Michael Gielen 1965; 2007 reissue, CD Wergo 66982, mono.
Zimmermann, Bernd Alois, "Vokalsinfonie aus Die Soldaten für sechs Gesangssolisten und Orchester", WDR Symphony Orchestra Cologne, Conductor: Hiroshi Wakasugi, Harmonia Mundi.

References 

Further sources
 Wulf Konold, Bernd Alois Zimmermann. Der Komponist und sein Werk, (Köln, FDR: DuMont, 1986), .
 Karl J. Kutsch and Leo Riemens, Großes Sängerlexikon (Munich: K. G. Saur Verlag, 1999/2000, Digitale Bibliothek Band 33), .

1927 births
2012 deaths
Musicians from Budapest
Hungarian operatic sopranos
Franz Liszt Academy of Music alumni
20th-century Hungarian women opera singers